Eilema formosa is a moth of the subfamily Arctiinae. It was described by Hervé de Toulgoët in 1971. It is found on Madagascar.

References

formosa
Moths described in 1971